Flèche was a French corvette built by Louis-Hilarion Chapelle (cadet) and launched at Toulon, France in 1768. The British captured her at the Fall of Bastia in May 1794 and commissioned her into the Royal Navy under her existing name. She observed the naval Battle of Hyères Islands, but then was wrecked in 1795.

French service and capture
Flèche was a French corvette built by Louis-Hilarion Chapelle (cadet) and launched at Toulon, France on 19 October 1768. In 1776, she was under Lieutenant Durfort, part of the squadron under Du Chaffault.

Flèche was substantially refitted in 1779–1780. By 1786 she was the most elderly surviving corvette.

In the early 1790s she was stationed at Smyrna. In April 1790, while under the command of major de vaisseau chevalier de Lestang-Parade, she sailed on a mission to Saloniki, and then to Largentière. She then returned to Toulon via Paros. Between 12 May and June 1792, while under the command of lieutenant de vaisseau Blanquet Du Chayla, she sailed from Tunis southward via Cerigo and Largentière.

The British captured Flèche on 21 May 1794 at the fall of Bastia. The French proposed in the articles of capitulation that the French Republic retain Flèche and a pink to transport the garrison, such civilians as wished to accompany them, and some timber, to France. The British refused, simply stating that they would provide any necessary transport.

British service and fate
The Royal Navy commissioned her as HMS Fleche under Commander John Gore upon her capture. He fitted her out and sailed her to Malta where he negotiated with the Grand Master of the Knights Hospitaller Emmanuel de Rohan-Polduc for seamen, supplies, and the like. On 13 September Gore was a witness at the trial of Lieutenant William Walker, commander of the hired armed cutter Rose, on charges that Walker had accepted money from merchants at Bastia to convoy their vessels to Leghorn, where the court-martial took place. Walker was acquitted.  Gore received promotion to post captain on 14 November 1794.

Lieutenant Thomas Boys replaced Gore in 1795, on Boys' promotion to commander on 30 January 1795.

Fleche observed the battle from a distance. Lieutenant Charles Came replaced Boys.

Fleche wrecked in the bay of San Fiorenzo in November 1795, but without loss of life. As she was entering the port during the night she grounded. The next day efforts to lighten her failed to free her and her crew left. By morning it was clear that she had capsized. The subsequent court martial castigated Came for his "great want of attention".

Citations

References
The Annual Biography and Obituary (1837), Vol. 21. (Longman, Hurst, Rees, Orme, and Brown).
Byrn, John D. (2009) Naval courts martial, 1793-1815. (Barnham, Surrey, England; Burlington, VT: Ashgate for the Navy Records Society). Publications of the Navy Records Society, v. 155. 
 
 Fonds Marine. Campagnes (opérations ; divisions et stations navales ; missions diverses). Inventaire de la sous-série Marine BB4. Tome premier : BB4 1 à 482 (1790-1826)

External links
 

1768 ships
Sloops of the Royal Navy
Captured ships
Maritime incidents in 1795
Shipwrecks of Corsica